The V-STOL XC 2000T is an American homebuilt and ultralight trainer aircraft that was designed and produced by V-STOL Aircraft of Fort Myers, Florida, introduced in the fall of 1997. When it was available the aircraft was supplied as a kit for amateur construction.

Design and development
A derivative of the Starflight XC2000, the aircraft features a wire-braced parasol wing, a two-seats-in-side-by-side configuration open cockpit with a windshield, fixed tricycle landing gear and a single engine in pusher configuration.

The XC 2000T is made from bolted-together aluminum tubing, with its flying surfaces covered in Dacron sailcloth. The tailboom is an open Warren truss structure. Dual controls and an enclosed cabin were factory options.

The manufacturer estimated the construction time from the supplied kit as 100 hours.

Operational history
By 1998 the company reported that three kits had been sold and two aircraft were completed and flying.

In March 2014 four examples were registered in the United States with the Federal Aviation Administration, although a total of seven had been registered at one time.

Specifications (XC 2000T)

References

XC 2000T
1990s United States sport aircraft
1990s United States ultralight aircraft
1990s United States civil utility aircraft
Single-engined pusher aircraft
Parasol-wing aircraft
Homebuilt aircraft